The Mary Louis Academy, also known as TMLA, is an all-girls private Catholic college preparatory academy, located in Jamaica Estates, Queens, New York City.  TMLA's  campus encompasses eight buildings situated on private grounds at the top of one of the highest hills in Queens, hence TMLA's interscholastic nickname "The Hilltoppers".

The Mary Louis Academy was founded in 1936, by the Congregation of the Sisters of St. Joseph of Brentwood, New York, fulfilling their late General Superior, Mother Mary Louis's, dream to found an academy for young women in Queens. Archbishop Thomas Edmund Molloy had a hand in the birth of TMLA due to his conviction that the girls of the Diocese of Brooklyn deserved an academy of their own.

History 
For over 80 years, the Academy's tall, brick and limestone Collegiate Gothic main building on Wexford Terrace has been a distinctive part of the Queens skyline. Despite the increasing number of buildings, it is an architectural landmark that can be seen clearly from the Long Island Railroad. While traveling on the Long Island Railroad in early 1932 Mother Mary Louis, General Superior of the Sisters of St. Joseph, first saw that hilltop in the countryside of Jamaica Estates and selected it as her ideal site for an academy. Although Mother Mary Louis died suddenly on May 22, 1932, her dream of establishing this academy for young women in the urban enclave of Jamaica Estates was continued by her congregation of sisters.

When Mother Mary Louis' plans to build this academy for girls in Queens were set in motion, the Sisters of St. Joseph came upon an obstacle: that hilltop, the Fox/Adikes estate "Rose Crest", had already been purchased by the Passionist priests of the neighboring Immaculate Conception Monastery, with the intent to build a high school seminary for boys at that location. Archbishop Thomas Molloy intervened and convinced the Passionists to sell the estate to the Josephites, for exactly what they had paid for it themselves.

In 1935 the Sisters of St. Joseph officially acquired the hilltop Rose Crest estate, a landmark of turn of the century Queens, and the Mediterranean Revival white stucco mansion became the convent for the Sisters who were to staff this "Private School for Girls."  Mother Mary Louis had intended the new academy to be named Mother Fontbonne Academy, in memory of Jeanne Fontbonne, the foundress of the Sisters of St. Joseph in Le Puy, France. Archbishop Molloy suggested that the Academy be named in memory of Mother Mary Louis herself, as she had been such a driving force for education in New York and had personally chosen this property. Sister Mary Angelica Clarkin CSJ, Ph.D., the founding principal, applied to the New York Department of Education for the official Academy charter in the name "Mother Mary Louis Academy." When the charter was delivered, it arrived with the first two letters, as well as the last, in the word "Mother" missing, thus the word "The" was permanently affixed to the name of The Mary Louis Academy.

The first students were fifteen young women who were greeted by a faculty of eight sisters for the first day of school on September 14, 1936. Classes were held in the parlor of the mansion that presently adjoins the Academy (now known as the Mary Louis Convent), while plans for the permanent Academy building were formulated. During this time two wings were also added to the mansion, housing a refectory and a Mission style chapel.

The architect of the Academy's building, Henry Murphy, stated that he wanted to evoke the feel of the private prep schools found in New England. Mr Murphy proceeded to model the building after the Sterling Law Building at Yale University. The completed Academy building took shape over a period of two years and finally opened its doors on October 16, 1938, providing numerous classrooms and offices along with science laboratories, a Gymnasium, Locker Room, Cafeteria, Reception Parlor, Auditorium and Library. The beautiful Collegiate Gothic masterpiece, now known as the "Main" building, stands as a structural testament to both art and architecture. James Nelson, the builder of TMLA, celebrated the birth of his daughter during the building's construction by naming her for the Academy. Mr. Nelson subsequently registered his newborn daughter as TMLA's first prospective student. Mary Louis Nelson went on to graduate from TMLA in 1955.

In 1938 TMLA also opened the doors to the Mary Louis Kindergarten, a one-year pre-school program for 5-year-old girls and boys. The Kindergarten was housed in a cottage adjacent to the Convent and later moved to Immaculata Hall one of the larger cottages on the Academy's campus (the present day Formation Cottage). Many of the female graduates of the Mary Louis Kindergarten, including Mary Louis Nelson, went on to graduate from TMLA itself.

From the very beginning, a variety of extra-curricular activities extended the interests of the students. Mariel, the school newspaper, published its first issue in 1936. Glee Club and Orchestra, the drama club Genesians, and the language clubs fostered student talents.  The Athletic Association sponsored field days and many intramural events. The Christmas Pageant, sponsored by the Sodality, became an annual event. TMLA's Forensics Team (Speech & Debate) was gifted with their long serving Head Coach Bob Sheppard. Sports Night provided the students with the opportunity to exhibit their school pride and creativity, this evolved into Spirit Night and has become one of TMLA's most beloved and hallowed annual traditions. The year 1940 saw the first Commencement Exercises of The Mary Louis Academy, with the introduction of the C.L.S. Award. The C.L.S. Award is the Academy's highest honor and is awarded to graduates who most exemplify the three main hallmarks of a Mary Louis woman - Character, Loyalty and Spirit of Study.

Less than twenty years after its founding, the Academy's population had outgrown the building. All available space, including the Reception Parlor, the Faculty Dining Room, and several music rooms, had already been converted to classrooms. In 1955 construction began on an addition, initially to be named DeChantal Wing, but ever after known simply as "The Wing."  When the new wing was opened in 1957, the capacity of the Academy was doubled. The original Cafeteria, DeChantal Hall, was redesigned into a new seven room Music Complex, the original Locker Room became the ten room Guidance Complex, the Reception Parlor became the General Office, a new Biology Laboratory, a new Cafeteria, a Board Room, a Home Economics Complex, a new Locker Room and many classrooms were added. The new construction also added a third wing to the convent, in order to house the additional Sisters needed to staff the enlarged Academy.

During the 1960s and 1970s, the Academy knew many more changes in curriculum and the use of physical space. These came as a response to the educational climate of the times and the revision of the secondary school curriculum by the New York Department of Education. Resource Centers were created, a new Art Studio (named the Art Cottage) was constructed on the campus, and the Library was enlarged. The 1970s also saw the Mary Louis Kindergarten close its doors, in deference to the neighboring Immaculate Conception Elementary School instituting a Kindergarten program of their own.

As a response to the needs of the 1980s, Computer Science was introduced, and a Computer Room was created. The Academy applied for and was granted accreditation by the Middle States Association of Colleges and Schools. The Board Room was renovated and consecrated as the Academy's student Chapel to provide a sacred space that welcomes both faculty and students. This decade also saw the expansion of the campus with the purchase of neighboring property. In the 1990s, two computer laboratories were added and the Chemistry, Physics and Earth Science Laboratories were completely renovated and technologically updated. In addition to the new laboratories, computers were added to the resource centers, every classroom and the Library.

In the new millennium the Auditorium underwent a period renovation with restored lighting, refinished stage, new flooring, cushioned seats and air conditioning. The Main Staircase, constructed in 1937 of carved limestone and glazed terracotta tile, underwent an architectural restoration and the General Office (the original Reception Parlor) was restored to its 1938 floorplan. Home Economics was removed from the New York State Regents curriculum and the Home Economics Complex was redesigned into three additional classrooms. In 2004, TMLA expanded a third time, absorbing and totally renovating the adjacent wing of the Convent. This expansion provided more classrooms as well as additional academic and counseling offices. Since 2008 the Biology Laboratory and Art Cottage underwent renovations along with the installation of SMARTBoard technology in every classroom, laboratory and resource center throughout the campus.

In 2011 the number of Sisters residing in the Mary Louis Convent had dwindled to such a point that it was no longer feasible for them to maintain such a large residence; as a result the remaining Sisters relocated to neighboring convents and the Convent building was turned over to TMLA for The Academy's use. In the summer of 2014 TMLA expanded once again by totally renovating and repurposing the former Convent Building (the original Rose Crest Mansion). This expansion and renovation resulted in the addition of over 12,500 square feet to The Academy's facilities including a Student Lounge, Art Solarium, Robotics/Engineering Laboratory, Mathematics Laboratory, Culinary Arts Center, an 11 bedroom overnight Student Retreat facility and a return to the original Mission-style Chapel.

Upon the recommendation of the New York City Council, the Office of Mayor Michael Bloomberg approved the naming of Wexford Terrace between Edgerton Boulevard and Dalny Road, Mother Mary Louis Way, in honor of Mother Mary Louis Crummey CSJ, founder and namesake of The Mary Louis Academy. The 18-month-long process culminated with a televised dedication ceremony on May 1, 2009.

The Mary Louis Academy is chartered by the University of the State of New York, accredited by the Middle States Association of Colleges and Schools, and sponsored by the Congregation of the Sisters of St. Joseph.

Spirituality 

Overnight retreats available to all students at St. Joseph's Villa, the CSJ beachfront estate in the Hamptons.
Annual full day retreats for each grade level at St. Joseph's Renewal Center. 
Two full Chapels on campus.
Overnight retreat facility on campus. 
Full-time Campus Minister on premises.
Mass offered every day in TMLA's Chapels.
Service Homerooms where students volunteer to plan and carry out varied types of events and service projects designed to increase the community's awareness of social justice issues and bring about positive change in the world.
Junior's each contribute 50 hours of volunteer service to a program they select which provides help to individuals in need.
School-wide service projects to provide support and relief to those in need around the world.

Athletics 
The Mary Louis Academy TMLA sponsors athletic teams in 13 separate areas of interest, including Badminton, Basketball, Bowling, Cheerleading, Dance, Golf, Lacrosse, Soccer, Softball, Swimming, Tennis, Track and Volleyball.

Due to the high demand for competitive opportunities by student-athletes, TMLA has been afforded membership in two separate Athletic Conferences: the Brooklyn/Queens CHSAA and the Nassau/Suffolk CHSAA.

The athletic program has developed a cooperative program with the Academy's Guidance Department and Administration to monitor and encourage the number of scholar-athletes applications to colleges and universities which offer scholarships that combine academic and athletic achievement.

Alumnae 
 Patricia Fili-Krushel, past President – ABC Television Network, Retired Chairman – NBCUniversal Television Group
 Mary Gordon, Official New York State Author 2008–2010, McIntosh Professor of English at Barnard College.
 Jude Watson (Judy Blundell), Author - Scholastic Books; Winner - National Book Award for Young People's Literature
 Myra Turley, Film & Television Actress – Flags of Our Fathers, Mad Men
 Alice Adams (artist) - Sculptor, Fulbright Program and Guggenheim Fellowship Winner
 Patricia Reilly Giff – children's author, Newbery Medal winner
 Lauren LoGiudice – Stage and Television Actress
 Marilyn Hanold Neilson, screen actress and fashion model – Twentieth Century Fox
 Patricia Hynes, Past President – New York City Bar Association
 Marianne Githens, Ph.D., Distinguished Professor of Political Science – Goucher College
Orla McCaffrey, reporter – The Wall Street Journal

Notes and references 

Educational institutions established in 1936
Girls' schools in New York City
Roman Catholic Diocese of Brooklyn
Sisters of Saint Joseph schools
Roman Catholic high schools in Queens, New York
Jamaica, Queens
1936 establishments in New York City